Body Electric (1999) is a collaborative album by ambient artists Steve Roach and Vir Unis. The music is a unique blend of smooth ambient textures, techno rhythms and various acoustic and natural recordings.

The artwork on the album was created by computer artist Steven Rooke. Instead of a booklet, this CD comes with four cards. The first card contains the front cover and on the reverse side the liner notes while the other three cards feature a panel of artwork on each side.

Track listing
"Born of Fire" – 9:12
"Pure Expansion" – 10:16
"Mind Link" – 7:07
"Gene Pool" – 5:40
"Synaptic Gap" – 1:56
"Homunculus Within" – 4:15
"Bloodstreaming" – 3:10
"Solar Tribe" – 4:13
"The New Dream" – 3:58
"Cave of the Heart" – 7:00

Personnel
Steve Roach – analog and digital synthesizers, percussion, voice, treatments
Vir Unis – synthesizers, treatments
Omar Faruk Tekbilek – ney (on "Born of Fire")
Roger King – bass (on "Born of Fire" and "The New Dream"), EBow guitar (on "Born of Fire")
Linda Kohanov – voices (on "Pure Expansion")

References

1999 albums
Steve Roach (musician) albums
Collaborative albums